River Oaks Baptist School is a private, Christian, co-educational day school for students in preschool, lower school and middle school located in Houston, Texas. Founded as a mission of a small Baptist church in the heart of Houston, ROBS' Christian identity is a cornerstone of its academic philosophy. ROBS melds ambitious academics with robust character and spiritual development. The U.S. Department of Education named ROBS a 2019 National Blue Ribbon School. It was one of three Houston area schools and the only private school in Texas to receive the award in 2019. The school hosts several sports teams with high success in their conferences, as well as an art program.

The school just opened the new Mosing Middle School Building and Sarofim Leadership Center on an adjacent lot facing Westheimer Road.

The school's head is Dr. Todd Herauf. The Head of Preschool is Dr. Dawn Hanson, the Head of Lower School is Tara Currin, and the Head of Middle School is Dr. Connor Cook. Their previous longterm headmaster was the late Dr. Nancy Hightower, whose name graces the main building and entrance.

Location

ROBS is located on the property of River Oaks Baptist Church, between the Oak Estates and Royden Oaks neighborhoods, in proximity to River Oaks. Students from approximately 40 different zip codes attend ROBS. The school takes up approximately 21 acres.

History
River Oaks Baptist School was founded by River Oaks Baptist Church in 1955. The School began as a weekly preschool and kindergarten, with two teachers and 30 students. Demand for more classes prompted the gradual expansion of the School. In 1979, the School celebrated the graduation of its first eighth grade class. In 1980, with 527 students in Preschool, Lower School, and Middle School, the significant enlargement of the School’s campus began. The campus master plan was completed in 2006, and the School now serves approximately 850 students from age two to eighth grade. Justise Winslow, a current NBA basketball player for the Miami Heat, attended River Oaks Baptist. In 2016 the school celebrated its 60th anniversary. The school is currently constructing the new Mosing Middle School Building and Sarofim Leadership Center on an adjacent lot facing Westheimer Road, which are scheduled to open in 2020.

Accreditations  
ROBS is accredited by the following organizations:
 Independent Schools Association of the Southwest (ISAS)
 Accreditation Commission of the Texas Association of Baptist Schools (ACTABS)
 Praesidium Inc., an organization that specializes in abuse prevention)

Memberships  
ROBS is a member of the following organizations:
 National Association of Independent Schools (NAIS)
 Education Records Bureau (ERB)
 Independent School Management (ISM)
 Association for Supervision and Curriculum Development (ASCD)

Awards  
 ROBS is a 2019 National Blue Ribbon School. It was one of three Houston area schools and the only private school in Texas to receive the award in 2019. 
 ROBS was the only school in the nation to receive the prestigious Melba Woodruff Award for Exemplary Elementary Foreign Language Program in 2008 from the American Council for the Teaching of Foreign Languages.
 ROBS was one of 10 schools to be recognized as a National School of Character in 2004 by the Character Education Partnership.
 ROBS was the only independent school in Texas to receive the Texas Arts Basic Award from the Texas Commission on the Arts in 1997.
 ROBS received the Blue Ribbon Recognition Award from the U.S. Department of Education in 1991.

School uniforms
River Oaks Baptist School requires school uniforms for students in lower and middle school. Girls wear white or red shirts and plaid or navy skirts, jumpers, or pants. Boys wear white or red shirts and navy shorts or pants. Eighth graders may wear navy shirts and khaki skirts, shorts, or pants. More formal chapel uniforms are required on Wednesdays.

Sports
River Oaks Baptist School competes in the Houston Junior Preparatory Conference along with 10 other schools. ROBS fields teams in basketball, cross-country, football, field hockey, lacrosse, soccer, softball, tennis, track and field, and volleyball. ROBS has more than 14 teams and enjoys almost complete participation in extra-curricular activities. The athletic dept. is under the direction of Jesse Martin

In the 2012–13 school year, ROBS won conference championships in the following:
 Division 2 football
 Girls volleyball
 Boys volleyball
 7th and 8th grade girls cross country
 6th grade boys cross country.
 8th grade boys track and field
 8th grade girls track and field
 7th grade girls track and field
 7th grade boys track and field
 6th grade boys track and field

In the 2011–12 school year, ROBS won conference championships in the following:
 8th grade boys volleyball
 8th grade boys soccer
 8th grade boys track and field
 8th grade girls track and field
 7th grade girls track and field
 6th grade girls cross country
 6th grade boys track and field

Library
The  ROBS school library opened was built in 1997. It includes an open area that functions as a storytelling space and an area for school receptions. The library, designed by Kirksey Architects, also houses a large central reading room, an after-school study area, the office of the head librarian, a work area for other library employees, and a work area for volunteers. The library originally opened with relatively few computers;  now the library is a hub for many media sources, and contains 29 PCs and monitors.

In 2014, the library welcomed the addition of a new wing, dedicated to making and editing footage for a daily morning announcement show called KROB.  The show featured 4th graders, 7th and 8th graders giving everyone the opportunity to shine and show off talents as anchors and hosts for the show.

ROBS holds an annual Reading Festival to promote reading and to expand the library's collection of books. Authors of children's books visit campus to talk with students about writing, illustrating, and publishing and to conduct writing workshops with older students. Past visiting authors have included Willy Claflin, Nathan Hale(twice!), R.J. Palacio, Kelly Milner Halls, Grace Lin, Ken Oppel, and Rick Riordan. During the 2012 Reading Festival, the School received book donations worth more than $26,000.

Master Plan 
The school has a 2020 master plan of five parts.

It includes a new high tech S.T.E.A.M Education building that would accommodate the middle school. ( Lower schoolers would be more spread out with maker spaces in the existing buildings) You can find more about this at this hyperlink.

High schools
River Oaks Baptist School students apply to and continue on to several Houston-area high schools.

Private schools include:
 Duchesne Academy (Houston)
 Episcopal High School (Bellaire)
 The Kinkaid School (Houston)
 Saint Agnes Academy (Houston)
 St. John's School (Houston)
 St. Thomas High School (Houston)
 Strake Jesuit College Preparatory (Houston)
 Second Baptist School (Houston)

Houston ISD public schools include:
 Bellaire High School (Bellaire)
 Carnegie Vanguard High School (Houston)
 Debakey High School for the Health Professions (Houston)
 High School for the Performing and Visual Arts (Houston)
 Lamar High School (Houston)

Spring Branch ISD public schools include:

Memorial High School (Hedwig Village)

Boarding schools include:
 Phillips Exeter Academy (New Hampshire)
 St. Andrew's School (Delaware)
Hotchkiss School

See also

 Christianity in Houston

References

External links

 River Oaks Baptist School

Private K–8 schools in Houston
Christian schools in Houston
Independent Schools Association of the Southwest
Educational institutions established in 1955
1955 establishments in Texas
River Oaks, Houston